The Centre for Economics and Business Research (Cebr) is an economic consultancy based in London, United Kingdom. 

Cebr supplies economic forecasting and analysis to private firms and public bodies. It provides a range of economic services, including economic impact studies, macroeconomic forecasting, policy research, and general economic strategy and consultancy.

History 
Cebr was founded in 1992 by Douglas McWilliams, a former Chief Economic Adviser to the Confederation of British Industry and Chief Economist for IBM (UK), in the year that he won the Sunday Times Golden Guru Award for best United Kingdom economic forecaster. McWilliams was later the Gresham College professor of business.

Structure
Cebr's Forecasting and Thought Leadership team delivers forecasts of the British and global economies and a range of economic tracker reports, such as the Irwin Mitchell UK Powerhouse Report, and the Asda Income Tracker.

The Economic Advisory team covers the areas of economic impact analysis, economic simulations, policy analysis, market sizing, and valuations. The team has advised a variety of industries, including tech, energy, maritime, financial services, international trade, manufacturing, engineering, and the arts.

The Environment, Infrastructure and Local Growth team has provided analysis for transport planning and other areas of policy and strategy, including digital connectivity, and housing.

World Economic League Table
Since its first publication in 2009, Cebr's World Economic League Table (WELT) has provided a yearly measure of the comparative economic success of the countries of the world. Released once a year on Boxing Day (26 December), it receives global coverage.

In December 2020, Cebr predicted that China would overtake the United States as the world's biggest economy by 2028.

In December 2021, WELT 2022 saw the world's annual economic output exceeding $100 trillion for the first time during the year ahead.

In December 2022, the WELT report forecast a World recession in 2023. However, at the same time it predicted that India's annual growth trajectory would be 6.4% for five years ahead, then 6.5 per cent during the next nine years, taking India from fifth position in global rankings in 2022 to third position in 2037, after China and the United States.

In December 2022, Cebr also found that in 2022 China's economy had grown by only 3.2 per cent, well below the forecast figures, and attributed this to lockdowns in pursuit of China's Zero-COVID policy.

News releases
In 2009, Cebr issued a news release which stated that "The UK's public sector productivity shortfall is costing taxpayers £58.4 billion a year – in other words, not far short of half our income tax is paying for public sector inefficiency."

In May of the same year, another news release from Cebr stated that since 2007 the number of millionaires in the United Kingdom had halved, falling from 489,000 to 242,000.

In September 2022, Cebr issued a statement critical of HM Treasury in the debate about Kwasi Kwarteng's package of tax cuts in his September mini-budget. This accused the Treasury of "gross exaggeration", particularly on the cost of not implementing a planned increase in United Kingdom corporation tax which would take it to "one of the highest levels in the western world".

Notable people
Douglas McWilliams, founder
Vicky Pryce, Board member
Danae Kyriakopoulou, managing economist, 2013–2016

Notes

External links
Cebr reports
Cebr, "Productivity Matters: The Impact of Apprenticeships on the UK Economy", March 2013, southampton.gov.uk
Cebr, "The Value of Big Data and the Internet of Things to the UK Economy", report for SAS Analytics Software & Solutions, February 2016
Cebr, "Mind the generation gap: How you can lend a helping hand", report for Brewin Dolphin, 2016
Cebr, "London’s Business Base", a report for London Councils, November 2019
Cebr, "Trade and Cooperation Agreement – London impact: A Cebr report for GLA", Greater London Authority, January 2021
Cebr, "The impact of digital transformation on the UK economy" report for Virgin Media, February 2021
Cebr, "The Business Case for Affordable Housing" Peabody Housing Association, July 2021
Cebr, "Brexit deal analysis 2021" Mayor of London
Cebr, "Financial wellbeing and productivity in the workplace", report for Aegon, November 2021
Cebr, "Financial wellbeing and productivity in the workplace", report for Aegon, November 2021
Cebr, "Inflation Nation – A report by Yorkshire Building Society", Yorkshire Building Society, May 2022
Cebr, "Economic impact assessment of the Cambridge Biomedical Campus", for Cambridge Biomedical Campus, August 1922
Cebr, "The Economic Impact of Robotics & Autonomous Systems across UK Sectors" (Final Report), Department for Business, Energy and Industrial Strategy, November 2021

Other
"CEBR report says China to top the world economy in 2028", China Global Television Network channel at YouTube, 27 December 2021
"India to become $10 trillion economy by 2035, forecasts CEBR", WION channel at YouTube, 27 December 2022
"Reports: World economy is headed for a recession in 2023" WION channel at YouTube, 27 December 2022
British companies established in 1992
Consulting firms established in 1992
Companies based in the City of London
Macroeconomics consulting firms
Strategy consulting firms